Saint-Basile (Marcotte) Aerodrome  is located  north of Saint-Basile, Quebec, Canada.

References

Registered aerodromes in Capitale-Nationale